Barney Travers (1894 – February 1955) was an English professional footballer who played as a forward for Sunderland.

References

1894 births
1955 deaths
Footballers from Sunderland
English footballers
Association football forwards
Oak Villa F.C. players
Sunderland West End F.C. players
Sunderland A.F.C. players
Fulham F.C. players
English Football League players